This is the results breakdown of the local elections held in Asturias on 13 June 1999. The following tables show detailed results in the autonomous community's most populous municipalities, sorted alphabetically.

Overall

City control
The following table lists party control in the most populous municipalities, including provincial capitals (shown in bold). Gains for a party are displayed with the cell's background shaded in that party's colour.

Municipalities

Avilés
Population: 84,835

Gijón
Population: 265,491

Langreo
Population: 50,001

Mieres
Population: 50,760

Oviedo
Population: 199,549

San Martín del Rey Aurelio
Population: 21,758

Siero
Population: 46,664

See also
1999 Asturian regional election

References

Asturias
1999